Eslamabad Qanat Shahbaz is a village in Ladiz Rural District, in the Corrin of Zahedan County, Sistan and Baluchestan Province, Iran. At the 2006 census, its population was 61, in 14 families.

References 

Populated places in Zahedan County